Ständchen is the German word for a serenade, in the form of a song addressed to a beloved. Songs with that title include:

 "Ständchen" WAB 84, a song by Anton Bruckner
 "Vergebliches Ständchen" ("Futile Serenade"), Op.84 No.4, a song by Johannes Brahms; see List of compositions by Johannes Brahms by opus number
 "Ständchen", several songs by Franz Schubert
 "Ständchen", a song by Richard Strauss

See also
 :de:Ständchen, in German Wikipedia